Food Rules: An Eater's Manual is a 2009 book by Michael Pollan. It offers 64 rules on eating based on his previous book In Defense of Food in three sections: Eat food, mostly plants, not too much. (Apples are, by his definition, "food", while Twinkies are not, and ice cream is near the line.) The book attributes the "diseases of affluence", to the so-called "Western Diet" of processed meats and food products, and offers its rules as a remedy to the problem.

External links 
 Official website - Food Rules: An Eater's Manual
 Tara Parker-Pope. Michael Pollan Offers 64 Ways to Eat Food. The New York Times, Well blog, January 8, 2010.  Retrieved 2010-01-10.

American non-fiction books
2009 non-fiction books
Books by Michael Pollan
Books about food and drink
Penguin Press books